The Church Order or Church Ordinance means the general ecclesiastical constitution of a State Church.

History

The early Evangelical Church attached less importance to ecclesiastical ritual than the Catholic Church does. As early as 1526 Martin Luther observes in
Deutsche Messe und Ordnung des Gottesdiensts: "In sum, this and all
other forma are so to be used that where they give rise to a misuse they
should be forthwith set aside, and a new form be made ready; since outward
forma are intended to serve to the advancement of faith and love, and not
to the detriment of faith. Where this they cease to do, they are already
dead and void, and are of no more value; just as when a good coin is
debased sad retired on account of its abuse, and issued anew; or when
everyday shoes wax old and rub, they are not longer worn, but thrown away
and new ones bought. Form is an external thing, be it ever so good, and
thus it may lapse into misuse; but then it is no longer an orderly form,
but a disorder; so that no external order stands and avails at all of
itself, as hitherto the papal forma are judged to have done, but all forma
have their life, worth, strength, and virtues in proper use; or else they
are of no avail and value whatever" (Werke, Weimar ed., xix. 72 aqq.).
According to Lutheran ecclesiastical teaching (Formula of Concord,
II; Solida declaratio, x.; Apology, xiv.; Melanchthon's Loci, 2d
redaction in CR, xxi. 555-556; the Saxon Visitationsbuch of 1528; etc.) a
uniform liturgy is requisite only in so far as it is indispensable to uphold proper doctrine and the administration of the sacraments; whereas in general the rightful appointment of the external functions of church officers and their sphere in the congregations is committed to the church
governing board of the state authorities. The spontaneous development of
church law, and especially the regulation of divine service, the
sacraments, and discipline, as Luther ideally conceived it, proved
impracticable, and gave place, though not invariably so, to definition on
the part of temporal sovereigns. All these regulations, especially those of
governments and cities, by means of which the canonical church forms that
had previously prevailed in the land were modified in a reformatory
direction, while the newly developing church system became progressively
established, are called "Church Orders". Those of the sixteenth century
are the most important.

Format
A Church Order usually begins with a dogmatic part in which the agreement of the State Church with the general Lutheran confessions is set forth with more or less of detail (Credenda); then follow regulations concerning liturgy, the appointment of church officers, organization of church government, discipline, marriage, schools, the pay of church and school officials, the administration of church property, care of the poor, etc. (Agenda). A systematic topical arrangement is by no means always adhered to. As a rule, later compilations have made use of earlier forms, and thus the Orders are grouped in families.

See also
 Swedish Church Ordinance 1571
 Canon law
 Ecclesiastical Ordinances

Sources

External links
Die evangelischen Kirchenordnungen des XVI. Jahrhunderts, ed. Emil Sehling.
 Vol. 1/1
 Vol. 1/2

Die evangelischen Kirchenordnungen des Sechszehnten Jahrhunderts, ed. Aemilius Ludwig Richter
 Vol. 1
 Vol. 2

Church order
History of Lutheranism

sv:Kyrkoordning